Charles E. Hoover (September 9, 1865 – February 27, 1905) was an American catcher in Major League Baseball. He played for the Kansas City Cowboys in 1888 and 1889.

External links

1865 births
1905 deaths
19th-century baseball players
Major League Baseball catchers
Kansas City Cowboys players
Lincoln Tree Planters players
Kansas City Cowboys (minor league) players
Chicago Maroons players
Davenport Onion Weeders players
Kansas City Blues (baseball) players
Lincoln Rustlers players
Des Moines Prohibitionist players
Sacramento Senators players
Charleston Seagulls players
Macon Hornets players
Savannah Modocs players
Jacksonville Jacks players
Bozeman Irrigators players
Phillipsburg Burgers players
Baseball players from Illinois
People from Mound City, Illinois